Mud River Covered Bridge is a historic covered bridge that formerly spanned the Mud River at Milton, Cabell County, West Virginia. It was built about 1875, and is a single-span, modified Howe truss structure.

The bridge was restored in 1971 and listed on the National Register of Historic Places in 1975. It was relocated twice, first in 1997 to a temporary site near its original location, and then again in 2001 to a new location crossing a pond at the Cabell County Fairgrounds.

See also
List of covered bridges in West Virginia
List of bridges documented by the Historic American Engineering Record in West Virginia

References

External links

Covered bridges on the National Register of Historic Places in West Virginia
Buildings and structures in Cabell County, West Virginia
National Register of Historic Places in Cabell County, West Virginia
Historic American Engineering Record in West Virginia
Road bridges on the National Register of Historic Places in West Virginia
Wooden bridges in West Virginia
Howe truss bridges in the United States
1875 establishments in West Virginia
Bridges completed in 1875